Helminthoglypta diabloensis, or the silky shoulderband snail, is a North American species of air-breathing land snail. It is found in California, including the California Coast Ranges, Diablo Range, and other areas in Alameda, Contra Costa, Santa Clara, Yolo, Colusa and Napa Counties. The shell of H. diabloensis is described as having six to seven tightly coiled whorls.

This snail was previously described as Helix diabloensis.

References

Further reading 
 Cooper, J.G. (1869). On the distribution and localities of west coast helicoid land shells, &c. American Journal of Conchology, 4(4): 211-24

Molluscs of the United States
Helminthoglypta
Gastropods described in 1869
Endemic fauna of California
Fauna without expected TNC conservation status